Daniella Orion Perkins (born June 13, 2000) is an American actress and internet personality. She gained prominence through her main role as Ciara in the Nickelodeon series Knight Squad.

Early life
Daniella Perkins was born at the Anaheim Regional Medical Center to a white teen mother who raised Daniella and her younger sister, Devenity, as a single mother. Their father is African-American. She grew up in Orange County, California. As children, Perkins and her sister put on plays for their own amusement. She was homeschooled to make time for her career.

Career
Perkins attempted creating a YouTube channel at 11 with her sister. In 2008, they began a fashion, location, and restaurant review website WzTheBuzz and went on to officially launch it as a business in 2011. Perkins created a Musical.ly around 2015 and has since gained over 1.8 million followers on TikTok. In addition, her YouTube channel has over 800 thousand subscribers.

Perkins decided to pursue acting professionally in her early teens. Her first venture was with Devenity in the 2014 short film Senior Slasher. She made her television debut with a guest role on Girl Meets World in 2016.

Perkins began working with Nickelodeon in 2016, playing the recurring role of Sophie in the series Legendary Dudas. She starred as Ciara in the Nickelodeon series Knight Squad from 2018 to 2019, a role she reprised in a crossover episode of Henry Danger. She voiced Winnie in Middle School Moguls. She also made guest appearances in a number of Nickelodeon series, participated in reality series, and appeared in the 2016 television film, Blurt.

Perkins starred as the titular role in the 2019 Brat web series Red Ruby.

Filmography

Film

Television

Web

References

External links

Living people
2000 births
Actresses from Anaheim, California
African-American child actresses
American child actresses
American Internet celebrities
American television actresses
American web series actresses
21st-century American actresses
21st-century African-American people
20th-century African-American people
20th-century African-American women
21st-century African-American women